Music City Mystique is an independent indoor drumline based in Nashville, Tennessee.  Also known to fans as Mystique or McM, Music City Mystique is a member of the Southeastern Color Guard Circuit and Winter Guard International. Mystique competes in Percussion Independent World Class (PIW) which is for groups that perform music/visual programs of the highest difficulty in both SCGC and WGI. Music City Mystique has been a PIW Finalist every year since 1995 and were WGI World Champions in 1996, 1997, 1998, 2001, 2004, 2006, 2011, and 2017. Currently, Mystique is the only 8-time Winter Guard International Percussion World Champion.

History 

Music City Mystique was formed in 1995 by Don Click and Chris Finen in Nashville, Tennessee.  The group was formed by combining the drumlines of two local high schools, since neither school had the funding or members to compete separately. Since then, Mystique has grown tremendously and is not supported financially or otherwise by any local high school. Most members are college age, while several high schoolers participate as well.

Mystique currently competes in the Percussion Independent World Class in both SCGC and WGI. They are undefeated for their entire time in SCGC, and have never finished lower than 5th in WGI. They are also the only WGI World Class ensemble to receive three consecutive gold medals. The group regularly performs at Tennessee Titans games.

Past and Current Programs 

Score taken from final WGI show before the remainder of the season was cancelled due to the COVID-19 Pandemic.
Music City Mystique opted out of the competitive aspect of WGI's 2021 Virtual Season, participating in the eShowcase instead.

PIM = Percussion Independent Marching
PIW = Percussion Independent World

References

External links 
 Official website

Percussion ensembles
1995 establishments in Tennessee